Dimethylmagnesium is an organomagnesium compound. It is a white pyrophoric solid. Dimethylmagnesium is used in the synthesis of organometallic compounds.

Preparation
Like other dialkylmagnesium compounds, dimethylmagnesium is prepared by adding dioxane to a solution of methylmagnesium halide:
2 CH3MgX   +   2 dioxane      (CH3)2Mg  +  MgX2(μ-dioxane)2↓
In such procedures, the dimethylmagnesium exists as the ether adduct, not the polymer.

Addition of 1,4-dioxane causes precipitation of solid MgX2(μ-dioxane)2, a coordination polymer.  This precipitation drives the Schlenk equilibrium toward (CH3)2Mg.  Related methods have been applied to other dialkylmagnesium compounds. 

Dimethylmagnesium can also be prepared by combining dimethylmercury and magnesium.

Properties
The structure of this compound has been determined by X-ray crystallography. The material is a polymer with the same connectivity as silicon disulfide, featuring tetrahedral magnesium centres, each surrounded by bridging methyl groups.  The Mg-C distances are 224 pm. Dimethylberyllium adopts the same structure.

References

Organomagnesium compounds